In organic chemistry and biochemistry, a side chain is a chemical group that is attached to a core part of the molecule called the "main chain" or backbone. The side chain is a hydrocarbon branching element of a molecule that is attached to a larger hydrocarbon backbone. It is one factor in determining a molecule's properties and reactivity. A side chain is also known as a pendant chain, but a pendant group (side group) has a different definition.

Conventions
The placeholder R is often used as a generic placeholder for alkyl (saturated hydrocarbon) group side chains in chemical structure diagrams. To indicate other non-carbon groups in structure diagrams, X, Y, or Z are often used.

History

Usage

Organic chemistry
In polymer science, the side chain of an oligomeric or polymeric offshoot extends from the backbone chain of a polymer. Side chains have noteworthy influence on a polymer's properties, mainly its crystallinity and density. An oligomeric branch may be termed a short-chain branch, and a polymeric branch may be termed a long-chain branch. Side groups are different from side chains; they are neither oligomeric nor polymeric.

Biochemistry
In proteins, which are composed of amino acid residues, the side chains are attached to the alpha-carbon atoms of the amide backbone. The side chain connected to the alpha-carbon is specific for each amino acid and is responsible for determining charge and polarity of the amino acid. The amino acid side chains are also responsible for many of the interactions that lead to proper protein folding and function. Amino acids with similar polarity are usually attracted to each other, while nonpolar and polar side chains usually repel each other. Nonpolar/polar interactions can still play an important part in stabilizing the secondary structure due to the relatively large amount of them occurring throughout the protein. Spatial positions of side-chain atoms can be predicted based on protein backbone geometry using computational tools for side-chain reconstruction.

See also
Alkyl
Backbone chain
Branching (polymer chemistry)
Functional group
Pendant group
residue
Substituent
Backbone-dependent rotamer library

References

Organic chemistry